Clowes Glacier is a glacier  wide, which flows east to enter Mason Inlet, on the east coast of Palmer Land. It was discovered and photographed from the air in December 1940 by the United States Antarctic Service. During 1947 it was photographed from the air by the Ronne Antarctic Research Expedition under Finn Ronne, who in conjunction with the Falkland Islands Dependencies Survey (FIDS) charted it from the ground. It was named by FIDS for Archibald J. Clowes, English oceanographer on the staff of the Discovery Committee, 1924–46.

References 

Glaciers of Palmer Land